The Australian Booksellers Association (ABA) promotes the interests of booksellers in Australia. The association has its origins in state associations formed early in the 20th century, which later amalgamated into a federal association.

In 1985 the association was incorporated in Victoria and now acts as the national body representing Australian booksellers. Members range from independent bookshops to chain and franchise shops, as well as specialist, second hand, academic and educational booksellers. The ABA is governed by a Statement of Purposes and Rules, which is available on request.

The purposes of the ABA include providing a range of training and educational programs for members; establishing bonds between booksellers all over Australia; enhancing the unique role of books in our society; fostering and encouraging the selling of books; providing a national forum for member booksellers; providing technical advice and information to booksellers;

The association has a management committee elected by the membership. Members of the committee have a 'stewardship' role towards the membership as a whole and are expected to apply their skills to this task. The management committee assists in improving the association's policy, activities and administration to help the association achieve its objectives. The ABA has a permanent staff under the responsibility of the chief executive officer. The ABA is represented on most book trade councils and committees.

The ABA undertakes two major projects each year for the benefit of members: the annual national conference in May and the Kid's Reading Guide in November. The guide is a 32-page full-colour list of recommended new releases and classics reviewed by specialist children's booksellers who are passionate about literacy. Throughout the year the association produces training workshops and publications for members to improve their bookselling skills and administers the national book voucher scheme.

The ABA manages the annual Nielsen BookData Booksellers Choice Award, given to the Australian new release that booksellers most enjoyed reading, marketing and handselling during the previous year.

2015 Shortlist
 The 52-Storey Treehouse, Andy Griffiths & Terry Denton (Pan Macmillan Australia)
 This House of Grief, Helen Garner (Text Publishing)
 Lost & Found, Brooke Davis (Hachette Australia)
 Pig the Pug, Aaron Blabey (Scholastic Australia)
 The Rosie Effect, Graeme Simsion (Text Publishing)
 When the Night Comes, Favel Parrett (Hachette Australia)

Previous winners
 2014 Winner: Burial Rites, Hannah Kent (Hachette)
 2013 Winner The Light Between Oceans, M.L. Stedman (Random House)
 2012 Winner All that I Am, Anna Funder, (Text Publishing)
 2011 Winner The Happiest Refugee, Anh Doh (Allen & Unwin)
 2010 Winner The Kitchen Garden, Stephanie Alexander (Lantern)
 2009 Winner The Slap, Christos Tsiolkas (Allen & Unwin)
 2008 Winner Girl Stuff, Kaz Cooke (Penguin Australia)
 2007 Winner Salvation Creek, Susan Duncan (Random House Australia)
 2006 Winner The Secret River, Kate Grenville (Text)
 2004 Winner Joe Cinque's Consolation, Helen Garner (Picador)
 2003 Joint Winners Mao's Last Dancer, Li Cunxin | Death Sentence, Don Watson
 2002 Winner Diary of a Wombat, Jackie French & Bruce Whatley
 2001 Winner Dirt Music, Tim Winton (Picador)
 2000 Winner The Blue Day Book, Bradley Trevor Greive
 1999 Winner Stravinsky's Lunch, Drusilla Modjeska
 1998 Winner The Sound of One Hand Clapping, Richard Flanagan
 1997 Winner Burning for Revenge, John Marsden
 1996 Joint Winners Night Letters, Robert Dessaix | The Cook's Companion, Stephanie Alexander
 1995 Winner The First Stone, Helen Garner
 1994 Winner The Orchard, Drusilla Modjeska

The ABA has strong links with other book industry organisations, including the Australian Publishers Association and the Australian Society of Authors and their international counterparts Booksellers New Zealand, the Booksellers Association of Great Britain and Ireland and the American Booksellers Association. ABA is a member of the International Booksellers Federation.

See also
 List of booksellers' associations

References

External links 

 
 Australian Publishers Association
  What could be more convenient than your local bookshop?

Australian literature
Trade associations based in Australia
Bookselling trade associations